Jal is a 2013 Indian Hindi-language drama film set in the Rann of Kutch, India, and follows an overconfident water diviner Bakka who tries to solve the drought problems in his village, but faces unforeseen circumstances when he tries to help a female bird watcher save flamingos. The film is directed by Girish Malik and is his debut film as a director.

The film was premiered and received special mention at the "New Currents" section of the Busan International Film Festival 2013 and in the "Indian Panorama" section of the International Film Festival of India.

The film released in India on 4 April 2014. One World Films has collaborated with DAR Motion Pictures for the distribution of Jal in India. The film has received the National Film Award for Best Special Effects for the year 2013 at the 61st National Film Awards.
Jal was also short-listed as an Oscars 2014 contender in the Best Picture Category and the Best Original Score Category. The film advanced in the top 114 films in the Best Original Score Category.

Synopsis
Jal revolves around a young man named Bakka (Purab Kohli), who is gifted with a special ability to find water in the desert.  With the backdrop of water scarcity, the film tells a complex story of love, relationships, enmity, deceit and circumstances that bring about the dark side of human character.

Cast
 Purab Kohli as Bakka
 Tannishtha Chatterjee as Kajri
 Kirti Kulhari as Kesar
 Yashpal Sharma as Ramkhiladi
 Mukul Dev as Punya
 Saidah Jules as Kim
 Ravi Gossain as Rakla
 Rahul Singh
 Gary Richardson
 Rohit Pathak
 Bharat Hathi

Music
The music of the film is composed by Sonu Nigam and ace tabla player/percussionist Bickram Ghosh. This is their first composing collaboration for a Bollywood film.

The composer duo recorded the film's title song with Shubha Mudgal. The title song used ragas like Marwa and Puriya combined with rare musical instruments like the Armenian Duduk. The entire song was created in a day.

Jal'''s background score is by Sonu Nigam and Bickram Ghosh. They used a mix of Indian and International sounds with a lot of percussion. Sonu Nigam and Bickram Ghosh were nominated in Oscars 2014 long list among top 114 in the Best Original Score Category.

Soundtrack

Critical reception
 Times of India gave the film 3.5 stars : 'Jal' captures the bare beauty of the golden cracked earth and its tortuous tapestry in artfully mounted frames (cinematography: Sunita Radia). It's a picture-perfect album with stark sights and parched souls.
 Taran Adarsh from BollywoodHungama has rated 3.5/5 Stars and stated "JAL makes a rock-solid impact. It's poignant and powerful and I suggest, you take time out to watch this truly gripping fare"
 FilmFare'' gave the film 4/5 stars and appreciated the film "Great visuals and premise desiccated by a pedantic pace".

References

External links 
 
 Jal – Official Trailer on YouTube

2013 films
Films scored by Bickram Ghosh
Films scored by Sonu Nigam
Films about water
Films set in Gujarat
Water scarcity in fiction
Films that won the Best Special Effects National Film Award